Wayne Goldthorpe (born 19 September 1957 in Staincross, near Barnsley, Yorkshire) is a former professional footballer who played for Huddersfield Town, Hartlepool United and Crewe Alexandra. He also had loan spells at Bolton and Arsenal before being forced to retire from football due to ulcerative colitis. He then had great success in the pub and hotel trade in the Lake District before buying a greetings card business in Grange over Sands. He sold his businesses and has now retired to Morecambe with his longtime partner, where they collect antiques as a hobby.

References

1957 births
Living people
People from Mapplewell
English footballers
Association football forwards
English Football League players
Huddersfield Town A.F.C. players
Hartlepool United F.C. players
Crewe Alexandra F.C. players